The FC Istiklol 2021 season was Istiklol's thirteenth Tajik League season, of which they are defending Tajik League Champions, whilst they also participated in the Tajik Cup, Tajik Supercup and AFC Champions League.

Season events
On 26 January, Istiklol announced that Manuchehr Safarov and Emomali Ahmadhon were on trial with the club, alongside various other Tajik and CIS players.

On 27 January, Istiklol were drawn in to Group of A of the 2021 AFC Champions League, alongside Al Hilal, Shabab Al-Ahli and one of either, Beijing Sinobo Guoan, Brisbane Roar or Kaya–Iloilo.

On 8 February, Istiklol announced that Sanzhar Rikhsiboev had joined them on trial from Bunyodkor. The following day, 9 February, Istiklol announced that Tabrezi Davlatmir had left the club to sign a one-year contract with Estonian Meistriliiga club Narva Trans. and that goalkeeper Mukhriddin Khasanov had joined the club on trial. On 10 February, Istiklol announced that Islom Zoirov had joined the club on trial.

On 11 February, Istiklol announced the return of Nuriddin Davronov on loan from Borneo until after the AFC Champions League group stages in the Summer of 2021.

On 14 February, Istiklol announced that Yuriy Kolomoyets had joined the club on trial.

On 25 February, Istiklol announced that Tajik U16 goalkeeper Safarmad Gafforov had joined the club on trial.

On 3 March, Andriy Mischenko and Jovlon Ibrokhimov joined Istiklol on trial. Three days later, 6 March, Kennedy Igboananike also joined Istiklol on trial.

On 9 March, Nemanja Ilić joined Istiklol on trial, with Istiklol confirming that Ryota Noma was also on trial on 10 March.

On 11 March 2021, the AFC confirmed that Istiklol's Group A fixtures in the Champions League group stage would all take place in Riyadh, Saudi Arabia.

On 19 March, Huseyin Dogan joined Istiklol on trial.

On 29 March, Istiklol announced the signings of Andriy Mischenko, Ryota Noma and Huseyin Dogan to one-year contracts. On the same day, Istiklol also announced the signings of Mukhriddin Khasanov from Khujand and Safarmad Gaforov, Manuchehr Safarov and Islom Zoirov from Lokomotiv-Pamir.

On 6 April, Istiklol announced that Amadoni Kamolov had left the club to join Rayo Majadahonda.

On 13 April, Istiklol announced former manager Mubin Ergashev as their interim manager for their AFC Champions League group games due to having the required Pro Coaching License Vitaliy Levchenko did not.

On 7 June, Istiklol announced that they had parted ways with Huseyin Dogan by mutual consent.

On 28 June, Istiklol's next three home matches, against Dushanbe-83, Eskhata and Khatlon, where move to the Central Stadium in Hisor due to their regular Pamir Stadium in Dushanbe being used for the U17 CAFA Youth Championship.

On 19 July, Istiklol announced the signing of Shervoni Mabatshoev from CSKA Pamir Dushanbe, whilst Muhammadjon Rakhimov left the club to join Ordabasy and Daler Imomnazarov, Oleksandr Kucherenko and Vadim Yavorskiy all joined on trial.

On 5 August, Safarmad Gaforov joined Dynamo Dushanbe on loan for the remainder of the season.

On 7 August, Istiklol announced that they had signed Shokhrukh Kirgizboev from Kuktosh and Daler Imomnazarov from Dushanbe-83.

On 22 August, Istiklol the signing of Petar Patev on a free transfer from Slavia Sofia, on a contract until the end of the season.

On 7 November, Vahdat Hanonov and Manuchehr Safarov both left Istiklol to sign for Iranian club Persepolis, on contracts until 30 June 2024.

Squad

Out on loan

Transfers

In

Loans in

Out

Loans out

Released

Trial

Friendlies

TFF Cup

Preliminary round

Finals Group

Knockout phase

Competitions

Tajik Supercup

Tajik League

Results summary

Results by round

Results

League table

Tajikistan Cup

Final

AFC Champions League

Group stage

Knockout stage

Squad statistics

Appearances and goals

|-
|colspan="16"|Youth team players:
|-
|colspan="16"|Players away from Istiklol on loan:
|-
|colspan="16"|Players who left Istiklol during the season:

|}

Goal scorers

Clean sheets

Disciplinary record

References

External links 
 FC Istiklol Official Web Site

FC Istiklol seasons
Istiklol